Mithunam is a 2012 Indian Telugu-language drama film directed by Tanikella Bharani. It features S. P. Balasubrahmanyam  and Lakshmi. The film is based on a best selling Telugu novel of the same name, written by Sri Ramana. The film won four state Nandi Awards. The film is considered one of the "25 Greatest Telugu Films Of The Decade" by Film Companion. It also considered Lakshmi's performance as one of the "100 best performances".

Mithunam means couple in Telugu. It also a zodiac sign. AMR Productions released Mithunam all over India on 21 December 2012, to positive reviews.

Plot
Appadasu (S. P. Balasubrahmanyam) is a retired teacher who lives in his native village with his wife Buchchi Lakshmi (Lakshmi). Both are senior citizens, and all of their children are living abroad, though instead of feeling lonely and insecure about their life, both Appadasu and Buchchi have their own share of romance happening. They treat each and every day as a special day and enjoy the moments. This relationship also has its share of ups and downs, and what life has in store for them forms the rest of the story.

Cast
S. P. Balasubrahmanyam as Appadaasu 
Lakshmi as Buchchi Lakshmi
Mohan Krishna Indraganti (Voice-over)
Brahmanandam as the voice of one of the sons
Prakash Raj as the voice of one of the sons

Awards

CineMAA Awards
CineMAA Award Special Jury Award for Best Direction (2013) – Tanikella Bharani

Nandi Awards
Nandi Award for Third Best Feature Film (2013) – Bronze
Special Jury Award: - S. P. Balasubrahmanyam
Special Jury Award: - Lakshmi
Best Dialogue Writer- Tanikella Bharani

Soundtrack

Reception

Critical response
Mithunam received excellent response from critics. Idlebrain has said that this film is of ‘world cinema’ quality on international circuit. On a whole, Mithunam is a film that every Indian should watch.

References

External links
Mithunam Story written by Sri Ramana – Read online at Kahaniya

2012 films
2010s Telugu-language films
2012 directorial debut films
Indian drama films
2012 drama films
Films set in Andhra Pradesh